Mount Abbl, is a  mountain in the Miscinchinka Ranges of the Hart Ranges in the Northern Rocky Mountains.

Named for Canadian Army Private Ernest E. Abbl, from Prince George, BC.  Private Abbl served with the 2nd Canadian Division, 5th Infantry Brigade, Calgary Highlanders and was killed in action 8 February 1945, age 19 in the opening days of Operation Veritable. He is buried at Groesbeek Canadian War Cemetery, Netherlands, grave V.A.14.

References 

Canadian Rockies
Northern Interior of British Columbia
Two-thousanders of British Columbia
Cariboo Land District